The American Chicle Company was a chewing gum trust founded by Thomas Adams, Jr., with Edward E. Beeman and Jonathan Primle.

Thomas Adams

Thomas Adams (May 4, 1818 – February 7, 1905) was a 19th-century American scientist and inventor who is regarded as a founder of the chewing gum industry. Adams conceived the idea while working as a secretary to former Mexican leader Antonio López de Santa Anna, who chewed a natural gum called chicle. Adams first tried to formulate the gum into a rubber which was suitable for making tires. When that didn't work, he turned the chicle into a chewing gum called New York Chewing Gum.

In 1870, Adams created the first flavored gum, black licorice, which he named Black Jack. In 1871, Adams patented the first chewing gum making machine. In 1888, his gum was the first to be sold in vending machines.

Company history

The company was incorporated in Trenton, New Jersey on June 2, 1899. Its market capitalization was $9,000,000 with one third issued as preferred stock and 6% with cumulative dividends. The business was composed of the chewing gum concerns in Brooklyn, New York (Adams Sons & Company); Cleveland, Ohio (W. J. White & Sons); Chicago (J. P. Primley); Louisville, Kentucky (Kis-Me Gum Company);
and Toronto (S. T. Britten & Co.). The corporation operated factories and gum forests in Yucatan.

On January 8, 1920, Dr. Don Ricardo Moreira, of San Salvador of the Coldwell & Moreira firm, registered American Chicle Co. trademarks in El Salvador.

American Chicle utilized Dancer Fitzgerald Sample in 1950 to promote its products via radio, newspapers, and television. American Chicle was acquired by the pharmaceutical company Warner-Lambert in 1962; Warner-Lambert was acquired by Pfizer in 2000.

The American Chicle Company was renamed Adams in 1997; Cadbury purchased Pfizer's candy brands in 2003. Kraft Foods (now Mondelez International) purchased Cadbury in 2010. Many of American Chicle's brands are out of production.  Its best known product was probably Chiclets chewing gum which was discontinued in the early 2000s.

See also
American Chicle Company Building, New Orleans
Charles Ranlett Flint

References

External links
 — (not yet digitized)'

Chewing gum
Confectionery companies of the United States
Companies based in Trenton, New Jersey
American companies established in 1899
Food and drink companies established in 1899
1899 establishments in New Jersey
Cadbury Adams brands
Mondelez International brands
History of Queens, New York
Historic American Engineering Record in New York (state)
1962 mergers and acquisitions